Stohler is a surname. Notable people with the surname include:

Heather Stohler (1979–2008), American model
Jörg Stohler (born 1949), Swiss footballer

See also
Stoller, a similar surname
Stotler